Kim Ji-seok (born Kim Bo-seok on April 21, 1981) is a South Korean actor.

Early life and education
Kim is the grandson of Kim Seong-il, who worked as an independent activist in Manchuria during the Japanese colonial era. His grandfather was a student of Kim Gu, a Manchurian independence activist. 

Kim Bo-seok debuted in 2001 as a rapper in the five-member Eurodance boyband LEO (리오), formed to capitalize on the success of then-popular boyband g.o.d, however, LEO never hit it big, and the group disbanded after eight months.

After failing the exam to get into the theater department, Kim majored in German at the Hankuk University of Foreign Studies. Having attended middle school and high school in England, Kim is also fluent in English, and received his secondary teaching certificate in German and English in 2006. He also has a master's degree in Cultural Contents Planning from Kyung Hee University's Graduate School of Journalism and Communication.

Kim was told by the head of his agency that his birth name could be confused with veteran actors Jung Bo-seok and Kim Bo-seong, he was given the stage name "Kim Ji-seok."

Career
Kim began his acting career by appearing in the 2004 music video of Kim Hyung-joong's "She's Laughing", followed by several minor roles. Though his daily drama Likeable or Not recorded high ratings of over 40% in 2007–2008, Kim still did not become a household name. Then a year later, Kim played a member of the Korean national ski jumping team in Take Off, which became the second-highest grossing Korean film in 2009. His popularity increased even more when he played an immature, womanizing slave hunter ("chuno") in period drama The Slave Hunters, the lover of a transgender man in comedy Lady Daddy, and a competitive ex-boyfriend in Personal Taste.

Kim's first post-army acting project was horror film Two Moons (also known as The Sleepless), released in July. This was followed by television romantic comedies I Need Romance 2012 in June, and Cheongdam-dong Alice in December.
Kim then starred in Wonderful Mama (2013), Angel Eyes (2014), Unkind Ladies (2015), and Cheer Up. He also appeared as one of the cast members of talk show Hot Brain: Problematic Men.

Kim then starred in the hit romantic comedy drama, Another Oh Hae-young (2016), garnering praise from viewers for his comic acting. This was followed by  acclaimed historical drama The Rebel', which gained him recognition by critics for his outstanding portrayal of King Lee Yong. 
Kim was then cast as the lead male role in the romantic comedy drama Children of the 20th Century (2017) alongside Han Ye-seul, followed by another romantic comedy drama Top Star U-back as the titular character.

In 2019, Kim starred in the romantic comedy thriller When the Camellia Blooms.

In 2021, Kim will write a book, Writing your name on the breath of dawn'', to be published on December 13, 2021.

Personal life
Kim enlisted for his mandatory military service on May 24, 2010, at the Nonsan training center in South Chungcheong Province for five weeks of basic training. After serving active duty with the Defense Media Agency of the Ministry of National Defense in Yongsan-dong, Yongsan-gu, Seoul, he was discharged in March 2012.

Filmography

Film

Television series

Web series

Web shows

Music video

Television shows

Radio shows

Discography

Awards and nominations

References

External links

 
 

Male actors from Seoul
South Korean male television actors
South Korean male film actors
1981 births
Living people
Hankuk University of Foreign Studies alumni